Anania aureomarginalis is a moth in the family Crambidae. It was described by Koen V. N. Maes in 2012. It is found in Angola and Zambia.

References

Moths described in 2012
Pyraustinae
Moths of Africa